Danwon High School (Korean: 단원고등학교, Hanja: 檀園高等學校) is a coeducational high school located in Danwon District, Ansan, South Korea. It is a state school, being under the authority of Gyeonggi Province's Office of Education.

The school was founded in 2005. In cooperation with The Borderless Village, a non-governmental organization, in 2006 and 2007 it established a multiculturalism program.  Its motto is "self-realization." As of May 2013 there were 1542 pupils at the school.

MV Sewol tragedy
On April 16, 2014, a ferry carrying 325 of the school's junior class and a dozen of its teachers capsized en route from Incheon towards Jeju resulting in many fatalities and injuries.

The school was closed until April 24, when it opened only for the 75 surviving juniors; yellow ribbons were tied to the school's gate, and a shrine of flowers and hundreds of notes to the dead adorned the school's entrance.  A makeshift memorial was established in a nearby basketball gymnasium, with a wall of flowers and dozens of photos of the dead and missing.

The school's vice principal, Kang Min-kyu, who had been rescued from the ferry, died by suicide a few days after the disaster.

Sister schools
 Hanseo University
 Chungwoon University
 Soonchunhyang University

References

External links
  

Danwon-gu
Buildings and structures in Ansan
Education in Ansan
High schools in South Korea
Educational institutions established in 2005
2005 establishments in South Korea
MV Sewol